Acharn may refer to:

Acharn, Highland, Scotland
Acharn, Perth and Kinross, Scotland
Location of the Falls of Acharn